Dioscorea hispida, also known as the Indian three-leaved yam, (Tagalog: nami) is a species of yam in the genus Dioscorea, native to South and Southeast Asia. Known to be poisonous when fresh, careful processing is required to render it edible.

Culinary use

Several peoples use the tuber as food. The tuber is toxic when fresh due to the presence of saponins and calcium oxalate raphides, so it must be processed prior to consumption, typically by finely slicing into thin strips, placing in a sack or net, and leaving in a stream for a few days until the toxins have leached out. It is then dehydrated and cooked.

References

hispida